The 1998–99 Elitserien was the 65th season of the top division of Swedish handball. 12 teams competed in the league. The league was split into an autumn league and a spring league. The eight highest placed teams in the autumn league qualified for the spring league, whereas the four lowest placed teams qualified for Allsvenskan along with the highest placed teams from the autumn season of Division I (the second level). The six highest placed teams in the spring season of Elitserien qualified for the quarterfinals, whereas the two lowest placed teams qualified for the preliminary round of the playoffs, along with the two highest placed teams of Allsvenskan. HK Drott won the regular season and also won the playoffs to claim their ninth Swedish title.

League tables

Autumn

Spring

Playoffs

First round

IFK Ystad–LUGI HF 36–22
LUGI HF–IFK Ystad 33–29
IFK Ystad won 65–55 on aggregate

GIK Wasaiterna–IK Sävehof 26–22
IK Sävehof–GIK Wasaiterna 25–23
GIK Wasaiterna won 49–27 on aggregate

Quarterfinals

HK Drott–IFK Ystad 27–24
IFK Ystad–HK Drott 26–21
HK Drott–IFK Ystad 28–25
HK Drott won series 2–1

Redbergslids IK–GF Kroppskultur 34–9
GF Kroppskultur–Redbergslids IK 14–21
Redbergslids IK won series 2–0

IFK Skövde–GIK Wasaiterna 32–19
GIK Wasaiterna–IFK Skövde 19–31
IFK Skövde won series 2–0

IF Guif–Alingsås HK 30–32
Alingsås HK–IF Guif 26–23
Alingsås HK won series 2–0

Semifinals

HK Drott–Alingsås HK 28–21
Alingsås HK–HK Drott 24–28
HK Drott won series 2–0

Redbergslids IK–IFK Skövde 18–16
IFK Skövde–Redbergslids IK 23–26
Redbergslids IK won series 2–0

Finals

HK Drott–Redbergslids IK 30–19
Redbergslids IK–HK Drott 32–18
HK Drott–Redbergslids IK 27–18
Redbergslids IK–HK Drott 21–23
HK Drott won series 3–1

References 

Swedish handball competitions